Eucereon costulata is a moth of the subfamily Arctiinae. It was described by Gottlieb August Wilhelm Herrich-Schäffer in 1855. It is found in Panama and Venezuela.

References

 

costulata
Moths described in 1855